María Cristina Díaz Salazar is a Mexican lawyer and politician affiliated with the Institutional Revolutionary Party (PRI). She is a former municipal president (mayor) of Guadalupe, Nuevo León. Today, she is senator for the state of Nuevo León.

Education and professional career
Díaz Salazar studied law at the Universidad Autónoma de Nuevo León (UANL).  She is an active member of the PRI who has occupied various positions inside her party including president of the PRI in Nuevo León.   She has served as advisor for the IMSS, head of the National Institute of Migration in Nuevo León, local deputy in the Congress of Nuevo León, and has served in the Chamber of Deputies of Mexico during the LVI and LIX Legislature.  In 2006 she was elected to serve as municipal president (mayor) of the municipality of Guadalupe.

Duties in the Institutional Revolutionary Party
She was the secretary general of the PRI, until December 2, 2011. After the resignation of Humberto Moreira as President of the Institutional Revolutionary Party, she became the interim president of the party; but when Pedro Joaquín Coldwell took office as president of the party, she became the secretary general of the party again on December 8, 2011.

References 

Living people
Presidents of the Institutional Revolutionary Party
Institutional Revolutionary Party politicians
Municipal presidents in Nuevo León
Women members of the Chamber of Deputies (Mexico)
Women mayors of places in Mexico
Place of birth missing (living people)
Members of the Chamber of Deputies (Mexico)
Members of the Congress of Nuevo León
Autonomous University of Nuevo León alumni
1958 births
20th-century Mexican politicians
20th-century Mexican women politicians
21st-century Mexican politicians
21st-century Mexican women politicians
Deputies of the LIX Legislature of Mexico